Vidrek is a small village in Narvik Municipality in Nordland county, Norway.  The village is located along the Ofotfjorden, just east of the Skjomen fjord.  The population of the village is about 70.

On 10 April 1940, in the First Naval Battle of Narvik, the British flagship HMS Hardy was beached in flames on Vidrek, and about 30 seamen were killed.

References

Narvik
Villages in Nordland
Populated places of Arctic Norway